Samnite is an adjective meaning "having to do with ancient Samnium."

Samnite may also refer to:

 Samnites, the people of ancient Samnium
 Samnite (gladiator type), a gladiator who fought with the equipment and in the manner of a Samnite soldier
 Samnite Wars, wars between the Roman Republic and the Samnites

See also
 Samnis (disambiguation)